The Estádio do G.D. Peniche, officially named Estádio do Grupo Desportivo de Peniche is a Soccer-specific stadium located in Peniche, Portugal. The stadium hosts home games for G. D. Peniche and for Leiria Football Association tournament games.

References

Football venues in Portugal
Sports venues completed in 1941
1941 establishments in Portugal